Tazeh Kand-e Qeshlaq (also Romanized as Tāzeh Kand-e Qeshlāq) is a village in Nazluy-ye Jonubi Rural District, in the Central District of Urmia County, West Azerbaijan Province, Iran. At the 2006 census, its population was 116, in 33 families.

References 

Populated places in Urmia County